La Magwit (Antillean Creole for "The Marguerite") is one of the two historic cultural associations (societés) of Saint Lucia, and also the name of the society's yearly festival held every October 17.

The "marguerite" referred to by the name is not a daisy but a small magenta coloured globe flower, rather like a clover.

References

Anthony, Patrick A.B. (1985). The flower festivals of St. Lucia. Folk Research Centre: St. Lucia

Society of Saint Lucia
Saint Lucian culture